Mário Hollý (born 25 April 2000) is a Slovak professional footballer who plays as a central midfielder for MFK Skalica in the Fortuna Liga.

Club career

MFK Skalica
He made his professional Fortuna Liga debut for MFK Skalica on 17 July 2022 against MFK Ružomberok.

References

External links
 MFK Skalica official club profile 
 
 
 Futbalnet profile 

2000 births
Living people
Slovak footballers
Association football midfielders
MFK Skalica players
2. Liga (Slovakia) players
Slovak Super Liga players